The aphotic zone (aphotic from Greek prefix  +  "without light") is the portion of a lake or ocean where there is little or no sunlight. It is formally defined as the depths beyond which less than 1 percent of sunlight penetrates. Above the aphotic zone is the photic zone, which consists of the euphotic zone and the disphotic zone. The euphotic zone is the layer of water in which there is enough light for net photosynthesis to occur. The disphotic zone, also known as the twilight zone, is the layer of water with enough light for predators to see but not enough for the rate of photosynthesis to be greater than the rate of respiration.

The depth at which less than one percent of sunlight reaches begins the aphotic zone. While most of the ocean's biomass lives in the photic zone, the majority of the ocean's water lies in the aphotic zone. Bioluminescence is more abundant than sunlight in this zone. Most food in this zone comes from dead organisms sinking to the bottom of the lake or ocean from overlying waters. 

The depth of the aphotic zone can be greatly affected by such things as turbidity and the season of the year. The aphotic zone underlies the photic zone, which is that portion of a lake or ocean directly affected by sunlight.

The Dark Ocean

In the ocean, the aphotic zone is sometimes referred to as the dark ocean. The depth at which the aphotic zone begins in the ocean depends on many factors. In clear, tropical water sunlight can penetrate deeper and so the aphotic zone starts at greater depths. Around the poles, the angle of the sunlight means it does not penetrate as deeply so the aphotic zone is shallower. If the water is turbid, suspended material can block light from penetrating, resulting in a shallower aphotic zone.

The aphotic zone is further divided into the mesopelagic, bathyal, abyssal, and hadal zones. The hadal zone refers to the greatest depths, deeper than the abyssal zone. Some twilight occurs in the mesopelagic zone, but creatures below the mesopelagic must be able to live in complete darkness.

Life in the aphotic zone
Though photosynthesis cannot occur in the aphotic zone, it is not unusual to find an abundance of phytoplankton there. Convective mixing due to cooling surface water sinking can increase the concentration of phytoplankton in the aphotic zone and lead to under-estimations of primary production in the euphotic zone during convective mixing events. 

Unusual and unique creatures dwell in this expanse of pitch black water, such as the gulper eel, giant squid, anglerfish, and vampire squid. Some life in the aphotic zone does not rely on sunlight at all. Benthic communities around methane seeps rely on methane-oxidizing microorganisms to supply energy to other microorganisms. 

In some rare cases, bacteria use chemical energy sources such as sulfides and methane. Many of the animals in the aphotic zone are bioluminescent, meaning they can produce their light. Bioluminescence can be used both for navigation and luring small animals into their jaws. An excellent example of this is the angler fish, as it has a light lure protruding in front of its mouth from a unique appendage on its head which provides navigation and as bait for smaller animals.

Some animals can cross between the photic and aphotic zones in search of food. For example, the sperm whale and the southern elephant seal occasionally hunt in the aphotic zone despite the water pressure squashing their bodies; however, not fatally.

Aphotic zone migration 
After sunset, millions of organisms swarm up from the depths to feed on the microorganisms floating in the warm epipelagic zone. Many copepods and invertebrate larvae come up to shallower waters to eat the phytoplankton, which attracts many predators like squid, hatchetfish, and lantern fish. The migration of the many bioluminescent animals is visible to the naked eye. This nightly vertical migration is the largest (in terms of the number of animals) on our planet.

See also
 Abyssal zone
 Benthic zone
 Hadal zone
 Pelagic zone
 Photic zone

References

Aquatic ecology
Oceanography